Gower may refer to:

People
Gower (surname), including a list of people with the name
Baron Gower and Earl Gower, subsidiary titles of the Duke of Sutherland
Gower Champion (1919–1980), American actor, theatre director and dancer

Places

United Kingdom
Gower Peninsula, in South Wales
Lordship of Gower, an ancient district, the original meaning of the name Gower
Gower (UK Parliament constituency)
 Gower (Senedd constituency), of the Senedd
Gower (electoral ward), an electoral ward of Swansea, Wales
Gower (Llanrwst electoral ward), in Conwy, North Wales
Gower Street (London)

United States
Gower Township, Cedar County, Iowa
Gower, Missouri
Gower Gulch (Death Valley), California
Gower Street (Los Angeles), California
Gower's Island, Tennessee

Other uses
Gower (magazine), journal of the Gower Society
Gower Publishing, an imprint of Ashgate Publishing
Gower, a fictional character in Shakespeare's Henry V

See also
Gowers, a surname
Old Gowers, former pupils of University College School, London